Qaraqoyunlu (also, Karakoyunlu, Karakoyunly, and Qaraqoynlu) is a village and municipality in the Agsu Rayon of Azerbaijan.  It has a population of 1,373.

References 

Populated places in Agsu District